Hoopla Impro is an improvised comedy and drama company that was founded in January 2006 by Steve Roe and Edgar Fernando. It is the UK's first improv theatre. Originally based in Balham southwest London, its shows moved to The Miller in London Bridge in 2010.

During that time it has grown to become the UK's biggest improvisation training school, teaching thousands of people every year at venues around London. It has collaborated with Google, Facebook, Apple, ITV and Imperial College, and the company has been recommended by Time Out, The Evening Standard and The Daily Telegraph.

Annual Hoopla Improv Marathon
Hoopla runs an annual non-stop show for 29 hours every September, starting from 7pm on the Friday through to midnight on Saturday. It includes over 200 performers - many of whom are present throughout - and over 50 shows.

Hoopla's UK & Ireland Improv Festival
In 2019 Hoopla launched a Improv Festival in London, bringing together improvised comedy acts from around the United Kingdom and Ireland. Among the performances were The Actor's Nightmare, Music Box and The Committee.

Regular Performers
The listed teams are Hoopla-produced house teams, and regular weekend show performers.

Diversity
Hoopla aims to promote diversity in improv and comedy. Hoopla hosts a monthly night for BAME players, run by Do The Right Scene. After a 'Crash Landing' workshop, it presents a performance called 'Special Delivery'. Zeal and runs an LGBT 'Loud and Queer' night at Hoopla. 
The Playground is an all-female monthly night run by Lauren Shearing and Maria Peters's two-person improv show Breaking & Entering. In 2016 it was named by Time Out as one of "Six all-female comedy gigs not to miss this spring".

Hoopla offers a number of diversity scholarships to people who are unemployed or on low-income, students, key workers, over 60s, under 23, homeless or in sheltered accommodation or BAME.

Media coverage
Hoopla Impro's work has featured in several leading publications in the United Kingdom. In April 2014, the Evening Standard of London reported on the rise of tech workers in the city attending improvisation classes at Hoopla. In 2017, the British Comedy Guide reported how The Miller was becoming Hoopla Improv's dedicated venue, starting with a 50-hour improvisation marathon.

In June 2019, author Jessica Pan wrote an article for the Guardian on her experiences from a visit to Hoopla.

References

External links
 Course reviews
 The Black Women Transforming London's Improv Theatre Scene

2018 establishments in the United Kingdom
Improvisational theatre